Self-Portrait is a c. 1669 oil on canvas painting by Ferdinand Bol, now in the Rijksmuseum, in Amsterdam. Showing the artist in an embroidered robe leaning on a small sculpture of Cupid, it is thought to have been painted on the occasion of his second marriage to Anna van Erckel in 1669.

It is probably the self-portrait mentioned in the probate records relating to the artist's unmarried son Elbert, though it is unknown to whom it was bequeathed. It was sold as lot number 9 at a Weduwe C. Roos auction of the collection owned by a man named Wreesman on 17 August 1818. It was bought by Albertus Brondgeest, who left it to its current owner in 1849.

Exhibition history
Historische Tentoonstelling van Amsterdam, gehouden in den Zomer van 1876, Oudemannenhuis, Amsterdam, 1876.
Prijst de lijst. De Hollandse schilderkunst in de zeventiende eeuw, Rijksmuseum, Amsterdam, 6 April - 1 July 1984, cat.nr. 61, p. 2, 24, 234, 244, 266.
Portretten van echt en trouw, Frans Halsmuseum, Haarlem, 15 February - 13 April 1986, cat.nr. 9, p. 87.
De glorie van de Gouden Eeuw. Nederlandse kunst uit de 17de eeuw. Schilderijen, beeldhouwkunst en kunstnijverheid, Rijksmuseum, Amsterdam, 15 April - 17 September 2000, cat.nr. 74, p. 119.

References

Self-portraits
Portraits of men
Portraits by Ferdinand Bol
Paintings in the collection of the Rijksmuseum
1669 paintings